The third season of Medium, an American television series, began November 15, 2006, and ended on May 16, 2007. It aired on NBC.

Production
Despite a decline in the ratings during Season 2, NBC renewed Medium for a third season, but was missing from the fall schedule. The series was slated to return in 2007, however, in October 2006 NBC announced that Medium would return on November 15, 2006 at 9pm with a 2-hour premiere before settling into its 10.00pm slot the following week. The series moved from its previous Monday 10.00pm timeslot to Wednesdays at 10.00pm. Its move to Wednesday, airing against CSI: NY and Lost, resulted in further erosion in the ratings, falling into single digit millions of viewers. The ratings decline resulted in the show being on the bubble for renewal but during the season NBC ordered a full 22 episode season. The show was renewed for a fourth season in May 2007.

Cast and characters

Main cast 
 Patricia Arquette as Allison DuBois
 Miguel Sandoval as Manuel Devalos
 David Cubitt as Lee Scanlon
 Sofia Vassilieva as Ariel DuBois
 Maria Lark as Bridgette DuBois
 Jake Weber as Joe DuBois

Recurring cast 
 Madison and Miranda Carabello as Marie DuBois
 Neve Campbell as Debra
 Tina DiJoseph as Lynn DiNovi
 Ryan Hurst as Michael AKA Lucky Allison's Half Brother

Episodes

References

External links 
 
 

Medium (TV series) seasons
2006 American television seasons
2007 American television seasons